Tyler Alan O'Neill (born June 22, 1995) is a Canadian professional baseball outfielder for the St. Louis Cardinals of Major League Baseball (MLB). He made his MLB debut on April 19, 2018. He has represented Canada in international play, winning a gold medal at the 2015 Pan American games.

From the Greater Vancouver area of British Columbia, the Seattle Mariners selected O'Neill in the third round of the 2013 MLB draft.  In 2016, he was the Southern League Most Valuable Player (MVP) along with winning the Southern League championship with the Jackson Generals.  On July 21, 2017, the Mariners traded him to the Cardinals.  Later that year, he won the Pacific Coast League championship as a member of the Memphis Redbirds. After making his MLB debut in 2018 with the Cardinals, O'Neill struggled with injuries and split time between St. Louis and the minor leagues for two seasons before he became their starting left fielder in 2020, winning his first ever Gold Glove Award.

Early life and amateur career
O'Neill attended Garibaldi Secondary School in Maple Ridge, British Columbia and played for the Langley Blaze of the British Columbia Premier Baseball League. He grew up a fan of the Seattle Mariners. He committed to play college baseball at Oregon State University for the Oregon State Beavers.

Professional career

Seattle Mariners
The Seattle Mariners selected O'Neill in the third round of the 2013 MLB draft. He signed with the Mariners and made his professional debut with the Arizona League Mariners. In 2014, O'Neill played in only 51 games between the Arizona League Mariners, Everett AquaSox and Clinton LumberKings due to a broken bone in his right hand he suffered after punching a concrete wall in the dugout. He spent 2015 with the Bakersfield Blaze, where he posted a .260 batting average to go along with 32 home runs and 87 RBIs. O'Neill played for the Canada national team at the 2015 Pan American games in Toronto and the 2015 WBSC Premier12.  In the 2015 Pan Am Games final, Canada defeated the United States 7–6 in extra innings to claim the gold medal.

He spent 2016 with the Jackson Generals of the Southern League, where he batted .293 with 24 home runs and 102 RBIs.  Jackson won the Southern League championship after a league best 84–55 record, and O'Neill was the Southern League Most Valuable Player (MVP).  In seven playoff contests, he batted .448, three home runs and eight RBIs.  He began 2017 with the Tacoma Rainers of the Class AAA Pacific Coast League (PCL).

St. Louis Cardinals

2017
On July 21, 2017, the St. Louis Cardinals acquired O'Neill for pitcher Marco Gonzales and assigned him to the Memphis Redbirds of the PCL.

O'Neill finished 2017 with a combined .246 batting average, 31 home runs, and 95 RBIs in 130 games between Tacoma and Memphis.  The Redbirds became the 2017 PCL champions after defeating the El Paso Chihuahuas in five games in the league championship final, giving O'Neill consecutive minor league championships with two different organizations at two different levels.  The Cardinals added him to their 40-man roster after the season to protect him from being chosen in the Rule 5 Draft.

2018
MLB.com ranked O'Neill as St Louis' fourth best prospect going into the 2018 season. He competed in spring training for an opportunity to make the major league roster as a reserve, but hamstring and oblique injuries kept him out of play.  He began the season with Memphis and was promoted to MLB on April 19, 2018. He had been leading the PCL with six home runs and 18 RBI.  He made his MLB debut the next night at Wrigley Field against the Chicago Cubs, making him the sixth Canadian-born player to appear on an active MLB roster on the season. He was sent back down on April 28 after seven hitless at bats and recalled again on May 18.  He mustered his first MLB hit, a single off Yacksel Ríos of the Philadelphia Phillies that same night in a 12–4 St. Louis win.  O'Neill hit his first MLB home run the next day off Luis García.  On May 21, he amassed his first four-RBI game, and homered in his third consecutive game the following day. He was optioned back to Memphis on May 31 and was recalled by St. Louis for the second time on July 2 to take the spot of Dexter Fowler, who had gone on paternity leave. He was placed on the 10-day disabled list on July 5 with a hamstring strain, was activated on June 17, and was optioned back to Memphis. He was recalled once again on July 31 following the trade of Tommy Pham, and spent the remainder of the season in St. Louis. He hit his first walk-off home run on September 22, a 414-foot shot, against the San Francisco Giants, leading St. Louis to a 5-4 victory. In 61 games for the Cardinals, O'Neill batted .254 with nine home runs and 23 RBIs.

2019
In 2019, O'Neill made St. Louis' Opening Day roster, but his season was interrupted by injuries alongside being reassigned to Memphis for over a month. He was recalled to St. Louis in June, and finished the year with them. Over sixty games, he hit .262 with five home runs and 16 RBIs.

2020
O'Neill made St. Louis' Opening Day roster in 2020, and spent the whole season there starting in the outfield, slashing .173/.261/.621 with seven home runs and 19 RBIs over 139 at-bats. After the season, he was awarded his first ever Gold Glove Award for left field after leading major league left fielders with nine defensive runs saved and four outs above average alongside not committing an error over 344 innings.

2021
O'Neill returned as St. Louis' starting left fielder in 2021. On September 20, O'Neill was named the National League Player of the Week after leading the Cardinals to a 6-0 week while batting .391 with three home runs, nine runs scored, and a 1.308 OPS. He was later named the National League Player of the Month for September after hitting .328/.377/.731 with 13 home runs, thirty RBIs, and a 1.108 OPS. O'Neill finished the 2021 season with 482 at-bats over 138 games, slashing .286/.352/.560 with 34 home runs, eighty RBIs, and 15 stolen bases. He won his second consecutive Gold Glove Award in left field, being one of five Cardinals (an MLB record) to win the award.

2022
O'Neill opened the season as the club's starting left fielder. In mid-May, he lost his salary arbitration case against the Cardinals, and will make $3.4 million as opposed to his requested salary of $4.15 million. He struggled to open the season, slashing .195/.256/.297 with two home runs and 42 strikeouts over 32 games before he was placed on the injured list in mid-May with a sore shoulder. He was activated on June 7. On June 20, he was placed back on the injured list with a hamstring injury before being activated in mid-July. He was placed back on the injured list with another hamstring injury in September, and missed the remainder of the season. Over 96 games with the Cardinals, he hit .228 with 14 home runs and 48 RBIs. He was sent to play for the Salt River Rafters of the Arizona Fall League after the season to rehab.

2023
On January 13, 2023, O'Neill agreed to a one-year, $4.95 million contract with the Cardinals, avoiding salary arbitration.

Personal
O'Neill plays the piano, and entertained his teammates in the clubhouse during spring training in 2017 by playing the theme song to the "Lord of the Rings" film series on a keyboard. He has said his favourite song to play is "O Canada."

He was given the nickname "Popeye" while playing in the Southern League. O'Neill's father, Terry, was named Mr. Canada (an honor given to the nation's best body builder) in 1975.

O'Neill and his wife, Stephanie, were married in December 2021 in Hawaii.

In January 2023, O'Neill and Stephanie welcomed their first child, Audrie.

See also

 List of Major League Baseball players from Canada
 St. Louis Cardinals award winners and league leaders

References

External links

1995 births
Living people
Arizona League Mariners players
Bakersfield Blaze players
Baseball people from British Columbia
Baseball players at the 2015 Pan American Games
Canadian expatriate baseball players in the United States
Clinton LumberKings players
Everett AquaSox players
Gold Glove Award winners
Canadian sportspeople of Irish descent
Jackson Generals (Southern League) players
Major League Baseball outfielders
Major League Baseball players from Canada
Memphis Redbirds players
Pan American Games gold medalists for Canada
Pan American Games medalists in baseball
Peoria Javelinas players
Sportspeople from Burnaby
St. Louis Cardinals players
Tacoma Rainiers players
World Baseball Classic players of Canada
2015 WBSC Premier12 players
2017 World Baseball Classic players
2023 World Baseball Classic players
Medalists at the 2015 Pan American Games